The 2013 Bob and Mike Bryan tennis season officially commenced on 31 December 2012 with the start of the 2013 ATP World Tour. However, they did not choose to compete until a week later at Apia International Sydney, which started on January 7, 2013.

Year in detail

Early Hardcourt events

Sydney

Australian Open

The Bryans further cemented their legacy in tennis history at the season's first Grand Slam event, the Australian Open. Their victory in Melbourne was their 13th Grand Slam men's doubles title, the all-time record for a men's doubles team. They had previously been tied with Australians John Newcombe and Tony Roche.

San Jose

Memphis

Indian Wells Masters

Miami Masters

Clay court events

Houston

Monte-Carlo Masters

Madrid Masters

Rome Masters

French Open

They claimed their 14th Grand Slam win at the French Open, which just happened to be their second at the event, but in the interim had three final appearances.

Grass court events

London

Wimbledon

The Bryans won their 15th Grand Slam title, becoming the first men's doubles team ever in the Open era to hold all four Grand Slam titles at the same time.

Late Hardcourt events

Canada Masters

Cincinnati Masters

US Open

All matches
This table chronicles all the matches of Bob and Mike Bryan in 2013, including walkovers (W/O) which the ATP does not count as wins. They are marked ND for non-decision or no decision.

Doubles matches

 Source for Bob (ATP)
 Source for Mike (ATP)

Mixed doubles matches
Bob

Mike

Tournament schedule

2012 source
2013 source
2012 source
2013 source

Earnings

References

Bob and Mike Bryan
Bryans tennis season
2013 in American tennis